The Takenaka Carpentry Tools Museum is a museum of carpentry tools in Kobe, Japan. The museum was opened in 1984 with the objective of collecting and conserving ancient tools as an example of Japanese cultural heritage, in order to pass them on to the next generation through research and exhibitions.

More than 30,500 pieces of materials have been collected so far, and the museum has held exhibitions, lectures, seminars, classes outside of the museum, and workshops on the people who make use of the tools, as well as the resulting architecture and the culture of wood that surrounds it.

The project was designed and constructed by the Takenaka Corporation in collaboration with skilled woodworkers.

References

Further reading
John Adamson, "Takenaka Carpentry Tools Museum - Japan", Furniture & Cabinetmaking, issue 234, August 2015, ISSN 1365-4292, pp. 16–20
Azby Brown, The Genius of Japanese Carpentry : An Account of a Temple's Construction, 1989, Tokyo; New York: Kodansha International, 
William Howard Coaldrake, The Way of the Carpenter: Tools and Japanese Architecture, 1990, Weatherhill, 
Jens H. Jensen, "Holy Tools: A shrine to the craft and kit of Japanese carpentry rises in Kobe", Wallpaper, January 2015, pp. 66–70
Teijirō Muramatsu; Takenaka Daiku Dōgukan, Traditional European Woodworking Tools [Yōroppa no dentō mokkōgu], 1992, Kobe, Takenaka Carpentry Tools Museum,  
Toshio Odate, Japanese Woodworking Tools: Their Tradition, Spirit, and Use, 1998, Linden Publishing; reprint edition, 

Museums in Kobe
Woodworking tools
Carpentry tools